Giuseppe Rocco Favale (11 July 1935 – 29 June 2018) was an Italian Roman Catholic bishop.

Favale was born in Irsina, Italy and was ordained to the priesthood in 1962. He served as bishop of the Roman Catholic Diocese of Vallo della Lucania, Italy, from 1989 to 2011.

References

1935 births
2018 deaths
People from Irsina
20th-century Italian Roman Catholic bishops
21st-century Italian Roman Catholic bishops